The Puerto Rico Baseball Academy & High School (PRBAHS) is a non-profit organization combining academics and sports programs into one curriculum.  Its goal is to prepare its students for higher education, competitive college scholarship opportunities, and the Major League Baseball Draft.  The PRBAHS is one of the baseball high schools in Puerto Rico or the United States with this type of learning environment.

The school is located 30 minutes outside of San Juan near the University of Turabo in Gurabo, Puerto Rico. It admits students ages 14–18 into 10th through 12th grade.

History
The school was first envisioned by former Texas Rangers pitcher Edwin Correa, who was motivated by the decline of Puerto Rican players in the major leagues.  The Dominican Republic has recently had many more players signed than Puerto Rico has, in part because of differing rules.  United States standards, upheld by the PRBAHS, require players to complete a high school diploma or to be at least 18 years of age, while Dominican players are able to sign with major league organizations as early as 16 years of age.  For the 2003 season, there were 38 versus 79 on the Major League rosters that came from Puerto Rico and the Dominican Republic, respectively.

Although the school was founded in 2002, its inception began 1999, when founder Ed Correa coached at Las Palmas, the Los Angeles Dodgers’ complex located in the Dominican Republic. It was at Las Palmas where his vision began and he decided to use the complex as a model to draft his own prototype.

Program curriculum
The core academic curriculum includes courses in Spanish, English, United States History, Puerto Rican History, Latin American History, Biology, Work Management, Chemistry, Physics, Geometry, Algebra, Trigonometry, and Pre-calculus.  The available electives are Health, Photography, Psychology, Sports Psychology, Music, Journalism, Ethics, History of Baseball, and the Critical Analysis of Chess.

The baseball program emphasizes the mental, physical, and technical aspects of each position to create a complete understanding of the game.  Topics covered include throwing mechanics, weight training, fielding mechanics, communication, running the bases, the mental aspect of the game, run downs, the art of pitching, the art of catching, and bunt plays.

Community involvement
In addition to academics and sport, the school also encourages community outreach and involvement in local activities.  Students visit hospitals during the holidays, participate in interactive sporting days with disadvantaged children, and visit centers for children.

Notable alumni
 Hiram Burgos
 Carlos Correa
 Joe Jiménez
 Christian Vázquez
 Reynaldo Navarro
 Jesmuel Valentin
 Joe Colón
 Víctor Caratini
 Vimael Machin

References

Puerto Rico Baseball Academy and High School
Baseball Reference

External links
 Puerto Rico Baseball Academy & High School

2002 establishments in Puerto Rico
Baseball in Puerto Rico
Gurabo, Puerto Rico
High school baseball in the United States
High schools in Puerto Rico
Educational institutions established in 2002